Georg Daniel Speer (2 July 1636 – 5 October 1707) was a German composer and writer of the Baroque.

Speer was born in Breslau (today Wrocław, Poland) and died in Göppingen, Germany.

Writing
As a writer he wrote a musical treatise, political tracts, and fiction. In 1687 he published a treatise on music that is considered useful in understanding Middle Baroque music. His writing on music would influence German Baroque trombone works for over a century. In non-musical writing his political tracts led to his being imprisoned for a year and a half. In literature he is known for three or four autobiographical novels that give a feel of the musical scene of his era and make use of humor. In them the narrator is referred to as Daniel Simplex. His novels had largely become obscure until rediscovery in the 1930s.

Composing
As a composer, Speer for example produced music for trombones. Keyboard miniatures have also survived. He might be best known for his Sonata No. 29 from Die Bänkelsängerlieder for brass quintet, which is often played at weddings and formal occasions.

Works
1683 – Türkischer Vagant
1683 – Ungarischer oder Dacianischer Simplicissimus
1684 - Die Bänkelsängerlieder
1685 – Recens Fabricatus Labor oder Neugebackene Tafelschnitz
1687 – Grundrichtiger Unterricht der musikalischen Kunst 
1688 – Musikalisch-türkischer Eulenspiegel
1688 – Philomela angelica
1692 – Jubilum coeleste
Sonata in D minor

References

External links

1636 births
1707 deaths
17th-century German novelists
German Baroque composers
Baroque writers
German music theorists
German male novelists
German male classical composers
17th-century German writers
17th-century German male writers